Urban Education is a bimonthly peer-reviewed academic journal that covers the field of urban education. The journal's editor-in-chief is H. Richard Milner (Vanderbilt University). It was established in 1965 and is published by SAGE Publications.

Abstracting and indexing 
The journal is abstracted and indexed in Scopus and the Social Sciences Citation Index. According to the Journal Citation Reports, its 2017 impact factor is 2.1, ranking it 14th out of 40 journals in the category "Urban Studies" and 49th out of 238 journals in the category "Education & Educational Research".

References

External links 
 

SAGE Publishing academic journals
English-language journals
Education journals
Bimonthly journals
Publications established in 1965